The Ultimate Collection is a compact disc by Gladys Knight and The Pips, released on Motown Records, catalogue MOTD 0826, in October 1997. It is a collection of singles comprising many of the group's greatest hits, with liner notes written by Ruth Adkins Robinson.

Content
The disc contains all 19 singles released by Gladys Knight and the Pips on the Soul Records imprint of Motown; a 20th single, "The Look of Love," was released in the United Kingdom only and is not included here. All charted on the Billboard Hot 100 except for the first, "Just Walk in My Shoes"; 13 hit the Top 40 and twelve made the top ten on the rhythm and blues singles chart. "It's Time to Go Now" is the b-side of "I Heard It Through the Grapevine," their version released a year before that by Marvin Gaye. The song "Here I Am Again," already issued on the If I Were Your Woman album of 1971, was initially slated to be a single, Soul 35111 for a November 1973 release date. It was withdrawn, with that single designation going to "Between Her Goodbye and My Hello." One track, their cover of "Every Little Bit Hurts" previously done by fellow Motown artist Brenda Holloway, appeared on an album of cover songs from 1968, Silk 'n' Soul. This compilation disc was part of an "Ultimate Collection" series issued that year by Motown for many of their top-selling classic artists.

Starting in the late 1960s and early 1970s, standard industry practice shifted to a focus on album sales, where a single became less a separate entity and more simply an advertisement for an LP, and a lead single would be pulled off an album as a promotional tool. Prior to this, singles were concentrated upon as a profitable commodity, especially for smaller record labels, and albums were often built around already successful singles. Since Motown fixated on the hit single until the very end of its stay in Detroit, single versions of songs often featured different mixes than versions that would be later placed on albums. Singles were usually mixed "punchier" and "hotter" to sound better on car radios receiving AM broadcast. The single versions are the ones appearing here.

Personnel
 Gladys Knight — lead vocals
 Merald "Bubba" Knight — vocals
 Edward Patten — vocals
 William Guest — vocals
 The Funk Brothers — instruments tracks 1-18, 22
 Members of the Detroit Symphony Orchestra conducted by Gordon Staples — strings

Track listing
Singles chart peak positions from Billboard charts; Soul 35023 marked with asterisk bubbled under at position #129 on the Billboard Hot 100.

References

Gladys Knight & the Pips albums
1997 compilation albums
Motown compilation albums